The Mandja (also: Mandjia, Mandija, Manja) are an ethnic group found in the central region of the Central African Republic. They are related to the Gbaya people. They number approximately 250,000.

References

Ethnic groups in the Central African Republic